Leuconostoc palmae  is a Gram-positive, non-spore-forming and facultatively anaerobic bacterium from the genus of Leuconostoc which has been isolated from palm wine from Senegal.

References

 

Lactobacillaceae
Bacteria described in 2009